Liu Bao ( 190s–200s) was a Southern Xiongnu chanyu who lived during the late Eastern Han dynasty and Three Kingdoms period of China. His father was Yufuluo. His son, Liu Yuan, founded the Han Zhao dynasty during the Sixteen Kingdoms period.

Liu Bao was Yufuluo's heir. When Yufuluo died, his younger brother Huchuquan inherited the position of chanyu in accordance with the lateral succession order and appointed Liu Bao as the Tuqi King (a position for the heir apparent to the chanyu). Liu Bao had five Xiongnu tribes under his command.

In 216, Huchuquan travelled to the Han Empire to receive nominal titles from the Han imperial court and remained in Ye (present-day Handan, Hebei). Liu Bao succeeded Huchuquan as the chanyu while his brother Qubei became the Tuqi King. Liu Bao was one of the longest reigning chanyus among the Southern Xiongnu.

During Li Jue's coup in Chang'an, Liu Bao seized Cai Wenji as his concubine and had two children with her. He released her when Cao Cao paid a ransom for her. When his clan suffered from internal problems, Deng Ai advised him to relinquish some of his power.

See also
 Lists of people of the Three Kingdoms

References

 Fang, Xuanling (ed.) (648). Book of Jin (Jin Shu), Volume 101.

3rd-century Chinese people
People during the end of the Han dynasty
Former Zhao people
Chanyus
3rd-century monarchs in Asia